Lucas Ferreira Mendes da Silva, commonly known as Lucas Mendes, is a Brazilian footballer who plays as a right-back for Novorizontino.

Career
Lucas Mendes came through the youth ranks with São Paulo. After performing well in the 2011 Copa São Paulo de Futebol Júnior he was loaned to  Santo André in 2012 for their second division Campeonato Paulista campaign. Between 2014 and 2016 he represented Inter de Bebedouro, Barretos and Uberaba in the lower divisions of Campeonato Paulista and Campeonato Mineiro. He was loaned by Barretos to São Bento in May 2016 to play in 2016 Campeonato Brasileiro Série D. São Bento won promotion, and he stayed with them for the whole of 2017, winning promotion again from 2017 Campeonato Brasileiro Série C.

In November 2017 it was announce that Lucas Mendes had signed for Taubaté to compete in the 2018 Campeonato Paulista second division, but by the time the season started in January he had moved to rivals Sertãozinho. In April 2018 he signed for Botafogo-SP to compete in 2018 Campeonato Brasileiro Série C. After gaining promotion at the end of the season, he renewed his contract with Botafogo-SP for a further year.

References

External links
 
 

Living people
1992 births
Brazilian footballers
Association football defenders
São Paulo FC players
Esporte Clube Santo André players
Associação Atlética Internacional (Bebedouro) players
Barretos Esporte Clube players
Uberaba Sport Club players
Esporte Clube São Bento players
Sertãozinho Futebol Clube players
Botafogo Futebol Clube (SP) players
Clube de Regatas Brasil players
Campeonato Brasileiro Série B players
Campeonato Brasileiro Série C players
Campeonato Brasileiro Série D players